Missouri Amendment 2 or Missouri Constitutional Amendment 2 can refer to multiple amendments to the state constitution in Missouri:
2004 Missouri Amendment 2, a successful amendment to prevent same-sex marriage
2006 Missouri Amendment 2, a successful amendment to allow stem-cell research
2020 Missouri Amendment 2, a successful amendment to expand Medicaid

Constitution of Missouri